Jonathon Robert Brain (born 11 February 1983) is an English former footballer who played as a goalkeeper.

A former Carlisle United trainee, he joined Newcastle United in 1999. He moved on to Port Vale in 2003, never having played for Newcastle or Carlisle. Three years later, he transferred to Macclesfield Town, where he became the first-choice keeper. Following this, he spent the 2010–11 campaign with Walsall. He then entered the non-league scene with Nantwich Town, before joining Stafford Rangers in July 2013.

Career

Early years
Born in Carlisle, Cumbria, Brain started his career with Carlisle United, before moving on to Newcastle United in 1999. He never played a game for United, and in August 2002 returned to Third Division Carlisle on a month-to-month contract.

Port Vale
Brain was signed by Brian Horton for Second Division Port Vale in August 2003, giving up his job as a sports instructor at a holiday park in the process.

He went on to make 36 appearances in 2003–04, with the club's regular keeper Mark Goodlad out injured. He played 32 games in the inaugural season of League One. He was limited to a single Football League Trophy appearance in 2005–06, as the club's No. 1 Goodlad enjoyed his first injury-free season since Brain's arrival.

Macclesfield Town
In June 2006 he was once more signed by Horton, who had since taken up the management position at Macclesfield Town. After playing just nine league games for his new club, Brain suffered a broken leg on 25 November 2006, after colliding with Andrew Teague (who also broke his leg) in a game against Stockport County, and was ruled out for the rest of the season.

Initially turning down a new contract, he was given a short-term contract at the start of the 2007–08 season, and went on to make a successful return from his injury to reclaim his place as Macclesfield's first-choice goalkeeper, making thirty appearances in all competitions. At the end of the season, manager Keith Alexander offered Brain a three-year contract, which he signed.

In 2008–09 he played 52 games to become only the third player in the club's history to enjoy an ever-present campaign in the Football League. At the end of the 2009–10 season he was named in the League Two Team of the Week for the last week of March, but was released by the club after turning down a new contract.

Walsall
He signed a one-year deal with Walsall in June 2010. He started off the 2010–11 season as first choice goalkeeper, before losing his place to club legend Jimmy Walker, who was re-signed in October 2010. Brain vowed to win his first team place back off the 37-year-old, who was signed after a poor start to the season by Brain. At the end of the campaign Brain as released, whilst Walker was offered a new deal.

Non-league
He began training with Bradford City, but did not sign a deal with the club. Brain instead joined Nantwich Town in the Northern Premier League Premier Division for the 2011–12 season. He helped the "Dabbers" to the FA Cup First Round for the first time in the club's history in 2011, at which point they were eliminated by League One Milton Keynes Dons. He signed a new two-year contract with the club in March 2012, and was voted the club's Player of the Season. The club finished 14th in 2012–13, and Brain was transfer-listed as the club looked to cut costs.

Brain joined Stafford Rangers on a one-year contract in July 2013. He left Marston Road in March 2014.

Career statistics

Honours
Individual
Nantwich Town Player of the Year: 2011–12

References

External links

1983 births
Living people
Footballers from Carlisle, Cumbria
English footballers
Association football goalkeepers
Carlisle United F.C. players
Newcastle United F.C. players
Port Vale F.C. players
Macclesfield Town F.C. players
Walsall F.C. players
Nantwich Town F.C. players
Stafford Rangers F.C. players
English Football League players
Northern Premier League players